The Samsung Galaxy M23 5G is an Android-based smartphone designed, developed and marketed by Samsung Electronics. This phone announced on March 4, 2022.

References 

Samsung Galaxy
Mobile phones introduced in 2022
Android (operating system) devices
Samsung mobile phones
Samsung smartphones
Mobile phones with multiple rear cameras